Bernadeta Maria Bocek-Piotrowska (born March 11, 1970 in Istebna) is a Polish former cross-country skier who competed in the early 1990s. In the Olympics she was competing in 5, 15 and 30 km races, the 5 + 10 km pursuit and the 4 × 5 km relays. She took part in the 1992 Winter Olympics in Albertville with her best result being a 10th rank in women's 4 × 5 km relay. She finished eighth in the 4 × 5 km relay at the 1994 Winter Olympics in Lillehammer. In 1993 she was seventh in the 30 km race during world championships in Falun. In the 1998 Winter Olympics in Nagano the 4 × 5 km relay team became 13th, which was her best result in this games.

Cross-country skiing results
All results are sourced from the International Ski Federation (FIS).

Olympic Games

World Championships

World Cup

Season standings

References

External links
  
 
 

Cross-country skiers at the 1992 Winter Olympics
Cross-country skiers at the 1994 Winter Olympics
Cross-country skiers at the 1998 Winter Olympics
Living people
Polish female cross-country skiers
1970 births
Olympic cross-country skiers of Poland
People from Cieszyn Silesia
People from Cieszyn County
Sportspeople from Silesian Voivodeship